Margistrombus marginatus, common name: the Marginate Conch,  is a species of sea snail, a marine gastropod mollusk in the family Strombidae, the true conchs.

Subspecies 
 Margistrombus marginatus sowerbyorum Visser & Man In’t Veld, 2005
 Margistrombus marginatus succincta (Linnaeus, 1758)

Description
The shell size varies between 40 mm and 75 mm.

Distribution
This species occurs in the Andaman Sea, at the southern tip of India and the Strait of Malacca.

References

External links
 

Strombidae
Gastropods described in 1758
Taxa named by Carl Linnaeus